Nueva Ocotepeque Airport  is an airport serving the town of Nueva Ocotepeque in Ocotepeque Department, Honduras.

The runway is on the west end of the town. The north  of the runway have trees encroaching on the east side. There is high terrain east through southeast of the airport, and rising terrain in other quadrants.

See also

 Transport in Honduras
 List of airports in Honduras

References

External links
 Nueva Ocotepeque
 HERE Maps - Nueva Ocotepeque
 OpenStreetMap - Nueva Ocotepeque
 OurAirports - Nueva Ocotepeque
 Skyvector Aeronautical Charts - Nueva Ocotepeque

Airports in Honduras